Verkhnesolonovsky is a rural locality (a khutor) and the administrative center of Verkhnesolonovskoye Rural Settlement, Surovikinsky District, Volgograd Oblast, Russia. The population was 770 as of 2010. There are 16 streets.

Geography 
Verkhnesolonovsky is located 33 km south of Surovikino (the district's administrative centre) by road. Nizhnesolonovsky is the nearest rural locality.

References 

Rural localities in Surovikinsky District